The Mercedes-Benz F125 is an electrically driven, hydrogen fuel cell concept car unveiled at the 2011 Frankfurt Motor Show. It is named 125 to celebrate the 125th anniversary of Mercedes-Benz.

Powered by an electric motor at each wheel creating a rear-drive biased four-wheel drive "e4MATIC" system. The front motors provide  and the rear  with a total peak of  electric motor, powered by a 10-kWh capacity lithium-sulfur battery located in a vertical position behind the rear seats. The batteries are provided energy by a hydrogen fuel cell located between the front wheels.

The F125 has a claimed acceleration time to 100 km/h in 4.9 seconds and a top speed of 220 km/h.

References

External links

 Mercedes-Benz F125

F125
Hydrogen cars
Fuel cell vehicles
Hybrid electric cars
All-wheel-drive vehicles
Cars introduced in 2011
Grand tourers
Coupés
Automobiles with gull-wing doors